Katherine Bailess is an American actress, singer, and dancer best known for playing the role of Erica Marsh on the CW's hit show One Tree Hill, Life and Death Brigade member Stephanie on Gilmore Girls, and Kyle Hart on the VH1 series Hit the Floor.

Early life
Bailess was born in Vicksburg, Mississippi to Natalie and Bobby Bailess. Her father is an attorney and was a former linebacker for the Ole Miss Rebels football team at the University of Mississippi and was a teammate of Archie Manning. She began training classically in dance at age 4. She also participated in competitive gymnastics and cheerleading throughout her childhood. At age 11, Bailess performed on the televised Miss Mississippi Pageant as a dancer, and continued to perform for the pageant for 7 years. She won scholarships to study dance at both the Broadway Dance Center in New York City and Ann Reinking's Broadway Theater Project in Florida. She was a debutante.  After college, Bailess went on to study at the William Esper Studio's two-year intensive program.

Career
Bailess starred in the 2003 film From Justin to Kelly, playing the role of Alexa, and in Universal’s 2004 film Bring It On Again, playing the role of Colleen Lipman. Her TV credits include recurring roles on the popular WB shows Gilmore Girls and One Tree Hill. Kat also recurred on Fox’s The Loop, Sordid Lives the Series and guest starred on NCIS. Bailess starred in the YouTube comedic series Shit Southern Women Say written and directed by Julia Fowler.

She co-produced the film Elle: A Modern Cinderella Tale. Bailess was also featured on the soundtrack for From Justin to Kelly on the tracks "The Luv' (The Bounce)", "Wish Upon a Star", "That's the Way I Like It", and "Brighter Star".

Bailess played the role of Kyle Hart in the VH1 scripted series Hit the Floor.

Filmography

Film

Television

References

External links
Katherine Bailess Official Website

  Katherine Bailess  as Kyle Hart on VH1's Hit the Floor (TV series)

Living people
21st-century American women singers
21st-century American actresses
Actresses from Mississippi
American country singer-songwriters
American debutantes
American women country singers
American female dancers
American women singer-songwriters
American film actresses
American people of Welsh descent
American television actresses
American television hosts
YouTubers from Mississippi
Dancers from Mississippi
Female models from Mississippi
Marymount Manhattan College alumni
Musicians from Vicksburg, Mississippi
Singer-songwriters from Mississippi
William Esper Studio alumni
American women television presenters
Year of birth missing (living people)